Eminooeciidae is a family of bryozoans belonging to the order Cheilostomatida.

Genera:
 Eminooecia Hayward & Thorpe, 1988
 Isoschizoporella Rogick, 1960
 Macrocamera Gordon & d'Hondt, 1997

References

Cheilostomatida